Benito Garozzo (born 5 September 1927) is an Italian American bridge player. He won 13 world championship titles with the Italian Blue Team, starting in 1961 when he was added as a last minute substitute for the Bermuda Bowl, playing in regular partnerships with Pietro Forquet to 1972 and then with Giorgio Belladonna. During those championship years he came to be considered by many experts the world's best bridge player.

Life

Garozzo was born in Naples, Italy, at a time when his family lived primarily in Cairo, Egypt, but Naples was a second, summer home of his mother, four sisters and brother. At age six his brother taught him tresette, a partnership trick-taking game with dummy play. He also learned chess from his brother. During World War II, he lived at a sister's home in Naples, where family and friends played partnership games including tresette. During 1943 they started to play bridge with reference to a Culbertson book from 1933. After the war he returned to Cairo "and met better bridge players and I improved my game reading more recent books and playing the dummy on Auto Bridge." In 1984 he settled in Naples where he owned a jewelry business as of 1984.

Garozzo is user sillafu at Bridge Base Online. He has lived in the United States since 1987 and has been a citizen since January 1994. He is divorced with a son and daughter; his life partner for more than 30 years was Lea Dupont of Rockland, Delaware (also Italy and Florida). They were second in the quadrennial, 1998 World Senior Pairs Championship and won a major North American tournament for senior teams in 2009. She died on 6 April 2012.

Career

Forquet and Garozzo used the Blue Club bidding system, which they developed based on the Neapolitan Club that Forquet had used with its creator Eugenio Chiaradia, the "Professor" of the early Blue Team. They wrote one book on the system together, published in 1967 (Il Fiori Blue Team, in Italian, or the Blue Team Club), and Garozzo wrote another with Léon Yallouze (1968, in French). The Blue Team as "Italy" won nine consecutive then-annual world  championships, all of the seven Bermuda Bowl and two quadrennial World Team Olympiad tournaments from 1961 to 1969, retired for two years, and returned to win the 1972 Olympiad. 

The Blue Team had used six players without any change in personnel for the latter seven of those ten tournaments. Three of them retired after 1972, including Belladonna's longtime partner Walter Avarelli. Belladonna–Garozzo then established a partnership and co-created their advanced version of the Precision Club system called "Super Precision". With four other players sometimes including Forquet, they won for Italy three more world team championships in succession, the 1973 to 1975 Bermuda Bowls.

Books

 Il Fiori Blue Team, Forquet and Garozzo (Milan: Prati, 1967),   
 Le Trèfle "blue-team" (Paris: Presse spécialisée, 1968), 255 pp., 

 Bridge de compétition, esprit et technique, Garozzo and Léon Yallouze, with collaboration of Claude Delmouly and Jean Fayard (Paris: Fayard, 1968), 293 pp.; also known as Bridge de l'avenir, 
 The Blue Club, Garozzo and Yallouze, adapted [from the French] by Terence Reese (Faber and Faber, 1969) – "Adaptation of Bridge de compétition." 
 Italian Blue Team bridge book, Forquet and Garozzo with Enzo Mingoni (Grosset & Dunlap, 1969), pp. 274 pp. – "Translation of Il fiori blue team.", ; (London: Cassell, 1970), 
 The Precision Club, C.C. Wei, adapted by Belladonna and Garozzo, transl. Jim Becker (The Bridge World and Barclay Bridge Supplies, 1972), 24 pp.,  and 
 Precision system e Superprecision, Belladonna and Garozzo (Milan: Mursia, 1973), 291 pp., 
 Precision and Super Precision bidding, Belladonna and Garozzo (Putnam, 1975), 237 pp., ; (London: Cassell, 1976),  – transl. of Precision system e Superprecision
 New revised summary of the Super Precision system, C.C. Wei, Belladonna and Garozzo (New York: Monna Lisa Precision Corp., 1975), 39 pp., 
 Il sistema Lancia, Belladonna and Garozzo (Mursia, 1976), 235 pp., 
 Il nuovissimo Fiori Romano, Belladonna and Garozzo (Mursia, 1976), 195 pp., ; see also Il sistema Fiori Romano (1955) and The Roman Club system of distributional bidding, Belladonna and Walter Avarelli (Simon and Schuster, 1959), 162 pp.,

Bridge accomplishments

Awards
 Charles J. Solomon Award (The Best Played Hand of the Year) 1975, 1980
 Romex Award (The Best Bid Hand of the Year) 1984

Wins
 Bermuda Bowl (10) 1961, 1962, 1963, 1965, 1966, 1967, 1969, 1973, 1974, 1975
 World Open Team Olympiad (3) 1964, 1968, 1972
 North American Bridge Championships (4)
 North American Swiss Teams (1) 1984
 Senior Knockout Teams (1) 1995
 Senior Swiss Teams (1) 2009
 Men's Pairs (1) 1971
 European Championships (5)
 Open Teams (5) 1969, 1971, 1973, 1975, 1979
 European Union/European Community Bridge League (2)
 Open Pairs (1) 1973
 Mixed Teams (1) 1983
 Italian Championships (18)
 Open Teams (12) 1958, 1963, 1967, 1968, 1970, 1974, 1975, 1976, 1977, 1978, 1983, 1985
 Open Cup (3) 1965, 1968, 1977
 Open Pairs (1) 1956
 Men's Cup (1) 2003
 Mixed Teams (1) 1983
 Other notable wins:
 Cap Gemini Pandata World Top Invitational Pairs (1) 1991
 Pamp World Par Contest (1) 1990

Runners-up
 Bermuda Bowl (3) 1976, 1979, 1983
 World Open Team Olympiad (1) 1976
 World Open Pairs (1) 1970
 World Senior Pairs (1) 1998
 North American Bridge Championships (6)
 North American Swiss Teams (3) 1981, 1995, 2000
 Jacoby Open Swiss Teams (2) 1993, 2001
 Mixed Pairs (1) 1983
 European Championships (3)
 Open Teams (2) 1977, 1983
 Senior Teams 2017
 European Union/European Community Bridge League (1)
 Open Pairs (1) 1969
 Italian Championships (8)
 Open Teams (5) 1965, 1966, 1979, 1980, 1986
 Open Cup (1) 1956
 Mixed Teams (1) 1984
 Senior Cup (1) 2003
 Other notable 2nd places:
 Lancia Challenge Match (1) 1975
 Sunday Times Invitational Pairs (1) 1971
 World Bridge Production Pairs (1) 2000

References

External links
 
 
 
 Audio-video interview uploaded 23 October 2009 by ACBLvideo at YouTube 
 "Benito Garozzo" at BridgeBum
 "Pietro Forquet" at BridgeBum (bridgebum.com)
  (including 1 "from old catalog")

1927 births
Italian contract bridge players
Contract bridge writers
American contract bridge players
Bermuda Bowl players
Sportspeople from Naples
Living people
Italian expatriates in Egypt
Italian emigrants to the United States